Beyond My Reach is a 1990 Australian film starring Terri Garber. It was shot in Melbourne and Los Angeles.

Plot
Two Australian friends, a director and a writer, decide to seek their luck in Los Angeles.

Cast
 Terri Garber as Terri Nielson
 David Roberts as Christopher Brookes
 Alan Fletcher as Alex Gower
 Nicholas Hammond as Steven Schaffer
 Nancy Black as Jennifer Sellers
 Belinda Davey as Emma
 Christine Harris as Jade
 Nicki Wendt as Pam
 Jon Craig as Curt D'Angelo
 Constance Landsberg as Sally
 Chuck McKinney as Phil

References

External links

Beyond My Reach at TCMDB

Australian drama films
1990 films
1990 drama films
1990s English-language films
1990s Australian films